KGNV may refer to:

 KGNV (FM), a radio station (89.9 FM) licensed to Washington, Missouri, United States
 the ICAO code for Gainesville Regional Airport